The 1971 Washington Redskins season was the team's 40th in the National Football League, and its 35th in Washington, D.C. The Redskins were led by first-year head coach George Allen, who had been the head coach of the Los Angeles Rams for the previous five seasons.

Coming into the 1971 season, the team had not made the postseason in 26 years. The Redskins had had only four winning seasons since their last playoff berth in 1945, the most recent a 7–5–2 campaign in 1969 under Vince Lombardi, who died of colon cancer in September 1970.

Allen was Washington's fourth head coach in as many seasons. Lombardi succeeded Otto Graham, and assistant Bill Austin took over when Lombardi fell mortally ill in the summer of 1970, and posted a 6–8 record. 

Despite a broken left ankle suffered by leading receiver Charley Taylor in a Week 6 loss to the Kansas City Chiefs that forced him to miss the remainder of the season, the Redskins went 9–4–1, good for second place in the NFC East. They earned a wild card berth, but lost in the opening divisional round at San Francisco, 24–20.

Off-season

NFL Draft

Roster

Pre season

Schedule

Pre Season Game Officials

Pre season Game summaries

Week P1 (Saturday, August 7, 1971): at San Diego Chargers

 Time of Game:

Week P2 (Saturday, August 14, 1971): at Denver Broncos

 Time of Game: 2 hours, 40 minutes

Week P3 (Saturday, August 21, 1971): vs. St. Louis Cardinals

 Time of Game:

Week P4 (Saturday, August 28, 1971): vs. Baltimore Colts

 Time of Game:

Week P5 (Saturday, September 4, 1971): at Miami Dolphins

 Time of Game: 2 hours, 27 minutes

Week P6 (Saturday, September 11, 1971): vs. Cincinnati Bengals

 Time of Game:

Regular season

Schedule

Regular Season Game Officials

Standings

Regular Season Game summaries

Week 1 (Sunday, September 19, 1971): at St. Louis Cardinals

 Time of Game:

Week 2 (Sunday, September 26, 1971): at New York Giants

 Time of Game:

Week 3 (Sunday, October 3, 1971): at Dallas Cowboys

 Time of Game:

Week 4 (Sunday, October 10, 1971): vs. Houston Oilers

 Time of Game:

Week 5 (Sunday, October 17, 1971): vs. St. Louis Cardinals

 Time of Game:

Week 6 (Sunday, October 24, 1971): at Kansas City Chiefs

 Time of Game:

Week 7 (Sunday, October 31, 1971): vs. New Orleans Saints

 Time of Game:

Week 8 (Sunday, November 7, 1971): vs. Philadelphia Eagles

 Time of Game:

Week 9 (Sunday, November 14, 1971): at Chicago Bears

 Time of Game:

Week 10 (Sunday, November 21, 1971): vs. Dallas Cowboys

 Time of Game:

Week 11 (Sunday, November 28, 1971): at Philadelphia Eagles

 Time of Game:

Week 12 (Sunday, December 5, 1971): vs. New York Giants

 Time of Game:

Week 13 (Monday, December 13, 1971): at Los Angeles Rams

 Time of Game:

Week 14 (Sunday, December 19, 1971): vs. Cleveland Browns

 Time of Game:

Stats

Passing

Rushing

Receiving

Kicking

Punting

Kick Return

Punt Return

Sacks

Interceptions

Fumbles

Tackles

Scoring Summary

Team

Quarter-by-quarter

Postseason

Playoff Game Officials

Richard Nixon play
There was a rumor that President Richard Nixon called a key play that caused the Redskins to lose to the 49ers in the divisional round of the playoffs. Nixon, a friend of George Allen, once attended a practice game where he tried the same play to much better results.

Playoff Game summaries

NFC Divisional Playoffs (Sunday, December 26, 1971): at San Francisco 49ers

Point spread: Redskins +5½
 Time of Game:

Awards, records, and honors

References

Washington
Washington Redskins seasons
Washington Redskins